The 2021 Bucharest Challenger was a professional tennis tournament played on clay courts. It was the 1st edition of the tournament which was part of the 2021 ATP Challenger Tour. It took place in Bucharest, Romania between 20 and 26 September 2021.

Singles main-draw entrants

Seeds

 1 Rankings are as of 13 September 2021.

Other entrants
The following players received wildcards into the singles main draw:
  Nicolae Frunză
  David Ionel
  Ștefan Paloși

The following players received entry into the singles main draw as alternates:
  Filip Jianu
  Alexey Vatutin

The following players received entry from the qualifying draw:
  Matteo Arnaldi
  Ivan Gakhov
  Calvin Hemery
  Dragoș Nicolae Mădăraș

Champions

Singles

 Jiří Lehečka def.  Filip Horanský 6–3, 6–2.

Doubles

 Ruben Gonzales /  Hunter Johnson def.  Maximilian Marterer /  Lukáš Rosol 1–6, 6–2, [10–3].

References

2021 ATP Challenger Tour
2021 in Romanian tennis
September 2021 sports events in Romania